Panoa is a genus of Polynesian intertidal spiders. It was first described by Raymond Robert Forster in 1970, and it has only been found in New Zealand.

Species
 it contains four species:
P. contorta Forster, 1970 (type) – New Zealand
P. fiordensis Forster, 1970 – New Zealand
P. mora Forster, 1970 – New Zealand
P. tapanuiensis Forster, 1970 – New Zealand

See also
 List of Desidae species

References

Desidae genera
Taxa named by Raymond Robert Forster
Spiders of New Zealand